Frederick August Blank  (June 18, 1874 – February 5, 1936) was a professional baseball player. He was a pitcher for the Cincinnati Reds of the National League in 1894. He appeared in one game for the Reds on June 20, 1894.

References

1874 births
1936 deaths
Major League Baseball pitchers
Baseball players from Missouri
Cincinnati Reds players
19th-century baseball players
People from De Soto, Missouri